= Shuhurah =

Coordinates: 14°40′N 48°53′E

- Interactive map of Shuhurah
- Country: Yemen
- Governorate: Hadhramaut
- Time zone: UTC+3 (Yemen Standard Time)

Shuhurah is a village in eastern Yemen. It is located in the Hadhramaut Governorate.
